King Tou or Toi is the name of a king of Hamath, an ancient city located in Syria. He is referred to in 2 Samuel 8:9-10 as "Toi" ( Tō‘î) and 1 Chronicles 18:9-10 as "Tou" ( Tō‘ū). Both biblical accounts state that Tou paid homage to David, king of Israel, because he had defeated the army of Tou's enemy, Hadadezer, king of Zobah.

Biblical text (KJV)
2 Samuel 8:9-10 reads:

9 Now when Tou king of Hamath heard how David had smitten all the host of Hadarezer king of Zobah;

10 He sent Joram his son to king David, to enquire of his welfare, and to congratulate him, because he had fought against Hadarezer, and smitten him; (for Hadarezer had war with Tou;) and with him all manner of vessels of gold and silver and brass.

See also Wikisource: 1 Chronicles 18

Context
According to biblical studies professor Gershon Galil, "the Empire of David is a realistic historical phenomenon and the biblical description of its formation and consolidation is possible and reasonable ... Eight inscriptions recently discovered at different sites clearly indicate that a large kingdom named Palistin existed in northwestern Syria and southern Turkey. This is the reference to the ancient kingdom of Palistin, recently proposed by several scholars, which encompassed the cities Hamath, Aleppo and Carchemish," Prof. Galil says. "This kingdom was inhabited by different groups including Sea Peoples. They invaded the Levant in the 12th century BC, conquered vast areas, destroyed kingdoms and took over their lands." Gilil notes that "some of these inscriptions open with the words 'I am Tai(ta) the Hero, King of Palistin'. Given our philological and historical knowledge, it's clear that Tai(ta) should be identified with Toi, mentioned in the Book of Samuel and in Chronicles."

Palistin was one of the Syro-Hittite states which emerged in Syria after the Late Bronze Age collapse. It dates to at least the 11th century BC and is known primarily through the inscriptions of its king Taita and his wife.

Analysis
The text tells that King David successfully defeated an enemy of Tou's, Hadarezer, the king of Zobah. To congratulate David (and remind him that he was friendly to David), he sent his son Hadoram as an ambassador and with him a (presumably) large tribute, made mostly up of vessels of gold and silver and brass. David added them to his treasury, after rededicating them.

References

Monarchs of the Hebrew Bible
Syro-Hittite kings
Aramean kings
11th-century BC Aramean kings